Villafranca is a 1934 Italian historical drama film directed by Giovacchino Forzano and starring Corrado Racca, Annibale Betrone and Enzo Biliotti. It was based on a play by Benito Mussolini, then Italian dictator, about the 1859 agreement between Napoleon III and Count Cavour which led to the Second Italian War of Independence.

The film was made at the Fert Studios in Turin and on location in the city, which had been the capital of the Kingdom of Sardinia at the time of the film's events.

Cast
 Corrado Racca as Camillo Benso, conte di Cavour  
 Annibale Betrone as Vittorio Emanuele II  
 Enzo Biliotti as Napoleone III  
 Pina Cei as principessa Clotilde di Savoia  
 Giulio Donadio as Castelli  
 Alberto Collo as Il canonico Gazzelli - confessore di casa Savoia  
 Giulio Oppi as il marchese Virago di Vische  
 Ernesto Marini as Margotti 
 Gustavo Conforti 
 Vasco Brambilla 
 Felice Minotti 
 Nino Bellini 
 Edoardo Biraghi 
 Cellio Bucchi 
 Valentino Bruchi 
 Isora Cardinali 
 Guido De Monticelli 
 María Denis 
 Luigi Erminio D'Olivo 
 Carlo Duse 
 Oreste Fares 
 Mario Ferrari 
 Luigi Lampugnani
 Giulio Paoli 
 Guido Petri 
 Renato Tofone 
 Edoardo Toniolo 
 Egle Arista 
 Angelo Bassanelli 
 Roberto Pasetti

References

Bibliography 
 Goble, Alan. The Complete Index to Literary Sources in Film. Walter de Gruyter, 1999.

External links

1930s historical drama films
Italian historical drama films
1934 films
1930s Italian-language films
Films directed by Giovacchino Forzano
Films set in the 1850s
Films set in Turin
Benito Mussolini
Italian black-and-white films
1934 drama films
Cultural depictions of Napoleon III
Films set in Sardinia
1930s Italian films